F. L. Wallace (February 16, 1915 – November 26, 2004), sometimes credited as Floyd Wallace, was a noted science fiction and mystery writer. He was born in Rock Island, Illinois, in 1915, and died in Tustin, California, in 2004. Wallace spent most of his life in California as a writer and mechanical engineer after attending the University of Iowa. He also attended UCLA.

His first published story, "Hideaway", appeared in the magazine Astounding.  Galaxy Science Fiction and other science fiction magazines published his subsequent stories, including "Student Body", "Delay in Transit", "Bolden's Pets", and "Tangle Hold". His mystery works include "Driving Lesson", a second-prize winner in the twelfth annual short-story contest held by Ellery Queen's Mystery Magazine. His novel Address: Centauri was published by Gnome Press in 1955.  His works have been translated into numerous languages, and his stories are available today around the world in anthologies.

Footnotes

External links
 
 
 
 
 Encyclopedia of Science Fiction entry on F. L. Wallace

1915 births
2004 deaths
20th-century American novelists
American male novelists
American mystery writers
American science fiction writers
University of Iowa alumni
American male short story writers
20th-century American short story writers
20th-century American male writers
People from Rock Island, Illinois